Coarraze-Nay is a railway station serving Coarraze and Nay, Nouvelle-Aquitaine, France.  The station is located on the Toulouse – Bayonne railway line. The station is served by Intercités (long distance) and TER (local) services operated by the SNCF.

Train services

The station is served by regional trains towards Bordeaux, Bayonne, Pau, Toulouse and Tarbes.

References

Railway stations in Pyrénées-Atlantiques
Railway stations in France opened in 1867